The 2021 Presbyterian Blue Hose football team represented Presbyterian College in the 2021 NCAA Division I FCS football season as a member of the Pioneer Football League (PFL). Led by first-year head coach Kevin Kelley, the Blue Hose played home games at Bailey Memorial Stadium. The team got national notoriety for never punting.

Schedule

Game summaries

St. Andrews
In the opening game of the season against , Presbyterian quarterback Ren Hefley threw for an FCS single-game record 10 touchdowns in the 84–43 win. He completed 38 of 50 pass attempts and threw for 538 yards. Hefley broke the record of nine in a game, which was held by Willie Totten (Mississippi Valley State vs. Kentucky State in 1984) and Drew Hubel (Portland State vs. Weber State in 2007). Blue Hose backup quarterback Tyler Huff added two touchdown passes to set a new Division I team record (for both FCS and FBS) of 12.

Other records broken during this game include:
 Hefley's 10 touchdowns totaling 538 yards and his 38 completions were both Presbyterian Division I era records
 Wide receiver Jalyn Witcher's three touchdowns tied a Presbyterian Division I record for most receiving scores in a game
 The 621 total passing yards ranks second as a team in the Division I era (behind 648 against North Greenville)
 Presbyterian put up 56 points in the first half alone, which is a program record
 Presbyterian's 84 points broke a Division I program record

Fort Lauderdale

at Campbell

at Dayton

Morehead State

at Davidson

San Diego

Stetson

at Valparaiso

Marist

at St. Thomas

References

Presbyterian
Presbyterian Blue Hose football seasons
Presbyterian Blue Hose football